Abdul Bari Khan HI TI EF (born; 1961) (Urdu: پروفیسر ڈاکٹر عبدالباری خان) is a Pakistani cardiac surgeon and philanthropist. He is the founder of Indus Hospital and Health Network (IHHN) and served as the Network's CEO from 2007 to 2022. He has since taken on the new role as President of the Network.

Early life and education
Khan was born in 1961 in Karachi. He received his MBBS from Dow Medical College.

Awards and honours
 Hilal-i-Imtiaz (2019)
 Tamgha-e-Imtiaz (2015)
 Eisenhower Fellowship (2004)
 Asian Leadership Award (Lifetime Achievement Award)
 Hall of Fame - DOW Graduate Association of North America
 Honorary Trustee of Iqra Rozatul Atfal Trust

References

Living people
1961 births
Pakistani cardiologists
Pakistani philanthropists
Dow Medical College alumni
Pakistani medical doctors
Recipients of Hilal-i-Imtiaz
Recipients of Tamgha-e-Imtiaz
Eisenhower Fellows
Social entrepreneurs